Chhau is a village in the Jhunjhunu District, Rajasthan, India.

Villages in Jhunjhunu district

Deepak Kumar